"Boum Boum Boum" is a song by British singer Mika, written by himself alongside Doriand, while produced by Mika, Klas Ahlund and Tim Van Der Kuil. The song was released as a single on 11 June 2014 and was later included on the French as well as on the Italian and Japanese editions of Mika's fourth studio album No Place in Heaven (2015).

The album version is slightly different from the single release, with the ''boom boom boom'' female spoken words removed.

Composition
"Boum Boum Boum" is a Latin-influenced song that is "about Mika and his partner in love loving to make 'the act of love' everywhere they go"

Critical reception
Kevipod from Direct Lyrics praised the song's "easy chorus, cute French and summer vibe," commenting that he doesn't "see any difficulty for it to become smash in France or Belgium this summer."

Chart positions

Weekly charts

Year-end charts

References

Mika (singer) songs
2014 songs
2014 singles
Songs written by Mika (singer)
Casablanca Records singles
French-language songs